Urvanovo is a rural locality (a selo) in Lyakhovskoye Rural Settlement, Melenkovsky District, Vladimir Oblast, Russia. The population was 394 as of 2010. There are 14 streets.

Geography 
Urvanovo is located on the Urvanovskoye Lake, 35 km northeast of Melenki (the district's administrative centre) by road. Usad is the nearest rural locality.

References 

Rural localities in Melenkovsky District
Melenkovsky Uyezd